Thantlang Township is one of the nine townships in Chin State. Thantlang is the administrative town of inclusive nine circles (also called mountain ranges) attributed to the geographical and dialectical arrangements of the area. They are Khualhring Tlang (Khualhring circle), Vanzang Tlang (Vanzang circle), Zahnak Tlang (Zahnak circle), Bual Tlang (Bual circle), VaiLam Tlang ( VaiLam circle )Lautu Tlang (Lautu circle), Mara Tlang (Mara circle), Vailam Tlang (Vailam circle), Zophei Tlang (Zophei circle) and Bawipa Tlang(Bawipa circle). Only four circles speak Lai dialect. Zophei(Zophei and Bawipa circles), Lautu(Lautu circle), HawThai(Mara circle) speak their tribal language. The other fives circles and in Thantlang town speak Lai dialect. In Thantlang township, Lai dialect is the common use dialect. Lai dialect is also spoken at Hakha township and Falam township.

A variety of languages and different accents are spoken in Thantlang township, including Lautu, Zophei, Senthang, Lai and Lochei and Sizo.

History
"Thlantlang" means cemetery mountain. Prior to 1995, there were many old cemeteries on the south side of the mountain above the main town, where subsequently the Burmese military build a camp and a pagoda. Briefly, in the early 2000s, a small piece of northeastern Thantlang Township, namely the village tracts of: Lungding, Tikhuangtum, Tlangkhua, Tlangpi, Tlangte, northern Vanzang (Farrawn), and Zangtlang, was transferred to Falam Township. However, in 2008, in the reorganization of Chin State townships, these village tracts were restored.

Borders
Thantlang Township borders on:
Mizoram State of India to the west and north;
Falam Township to the northeast;
Matupi Township to the south; and
Hakha Township to the east;
Proposed Lailenpi Township in the southwest.

Communities
Thantlang is the major town in the township, with four smaller towns (larger villages) Leitak, Lungler (Lonle in Burmese transliteration), Hnaring (main town of Lautu tribe) and Ngaphepi (biggest village of the HawThai tribe). Lungler and Leitak have 16-bed hospitals (clinics). There are 37 village tracts and 76 villages in Thantlang Township.

Notes

External links
 "Htantlang Township, Chin State" map, Myanmar Information Management Unit (MIMU), 6 August 2009
 Township 57 on "Myanmar States/Divisions & Townships Overview Map" Myanmar Information Management Unit (MIMU), December 2007
 "Thlangtlang Google Satellite Map" Maplandia.com

Townships of Chin State